Charles Joseph Osman (April 15, 1851 – April 13, 1922) was a businessman and political figure in New Brunswick, Canada. He represented Albert County in the Legislative Assembly of New Brunswick from 1897 to 1908 as a Liberal member.

He was born in England, was educated in Hertfordshire and later emigrated to New Brunswick. Osman married Laura E. Tomkins. He was the manager of a plaster mill and quarries at Hillsborough. He was first elected in an 1897 by-election held after William James Lewis was elected to the House of Commons of Canada. Osman served as speaker from 1907 to 1908.

References 
 Canadian Parliamentary Guide, 1903, AJ Magurn

1851 births
1922 deaths
Businesspeople from New Brunswick
New Brunswick Liberal Association MLAs
Speakers of the Legislative Assembly of New Brunswick
People from Albert County, New Brunswick